The Demon Headmaster is a British television series based on the children's books by Gillian Cross of the same title. Made for CBBC, the drama was first broadcast on 14 October 2019, and is the second adaptation of the books, following the 1996 series. Nicholas Gleaves plays the titular character, a mysterious head teacher with strange powers and dreams of world domination.

The series is a direct sequel of the original series, and features Charlotte Beckett and Sally Oliver as Dinah Hunter and Rose Carter, roles originally portrayed by Frances Amey and Kathryn Wyeth. Amey was approached to reprise the role of Dinah, though no longer acts, whilst Wyeth is based in Wellington, New Zealand. It has been renewed for a second series.

Production
The series, adapted by Emma Reeves, is based on the newest series of books, beginning with Total Control (2017). These books focus on a new protagonist, Lizzie Warren, rather than Dinah Glass from the original books and series. The series was filmed on location in North Lanarkshire, Scotland.

Reeves pitched a second series to CBBC, using further elements of Total Control, as well as its sequel, Mortal Danger. As of June 2021, filming on the new series has been delayed due to the COVID-19 pandemic.

Cast
Nicholas Gleaves as The Headmaster
Ellie Botterill as Lizzie Warren
Jordan Cramond as Tyler Warren
Dijarn Campbell as Ethan Prendergast / Adebayo
Jordan Rankin as Blake Vinney
Shonagh Price as Beata Maron
Lori Stott as Angelika Maron
Kevin O'Loughlin as Rick Warren
Sally Oliver as Mary Warren/Rose Carter
Lola Aluko as Becky Whittaker
Jade Chan as Sophie Johnson
Sarah Paul as Auntie Beryl
Manjot Sumal as Mr Wasu
Euan Mitchell as Jakub
Charlotte Beckett as Dinah Hunter
Jasmine De Goede as Young Dinah
Terrence Hardiman as the Original Headmaster.

Episodes

References

External links
 

2019 British television series debuts
2010s British horror television series
2010s British science fiction television series
2020s British horror television series
2020s British science fiction television series
BBC children's television shows
BBC high definition shows
British children's science fiction television series
English-language television shows
Sequel television series
Television series by BBC Studios